Trophoblast glycoprotein, also known as TPBG, 5T4, Wnt-Activated Inhibitory Factor 1 or WAIF1, is a human protein encoded by a TPBG gene. TPBG is an antagonist of Wnt/β-catenin signalling pathway.

Clinical significance 

5T4 is an antigen expressed in a number of carcinomas. It is an N-glycosylated transmembrane 72 kDa glycoprotein containing eight leucine-rich repeats. 5T4 is often referred to as an oncofetal antigen due to its expression in foetal trophoblast (where it was first discovered) or trophoblast glycoprotein (TPBG).

5T4 is found in tumors including the colorectal, ovarian, and gastric. Its expression is used as a prognostic aid in these cases. It has very limited expression in normal tissue but is widespread in malignant tumours throughout their development. One study found that 5T4 was present in 85% of a cohort of 72 colorectal carcinomas and in 81% of a cohort of 27 gastric carcinomas.

Its confined expression appears to give 5T4 the potential to be a target for T cells in cancer immunotherapy. There has been extensive research into its role in antibody-directed immunotherapy through the use of the high-affinity murine monoclonal antibody, mAb5T4, to deliver response modifiers (such as staphylococcus aureus superantigen) accurately to a tumor.

5T4 is also the target of the cancer vaccine TroVax which is in clinical trials for the treatment of a range of different solid tumour types.

Interactions 

TPBG has been shown to interact with GIPC1.

References

Further reading 

 
 
 
 
 
 
 
 
 
 
 

Immunology